Chrysiptera talboti, known commonly as Talbot's damselfish and Talbot's demoiselle, is a species of damselfish. It is a marine fish from the eastern Indian Ocean and western Pacific.

Etymology
The specific name honours the fisheries scientist Frank H. Talbot the director of the Australian Museum in Sydney, the collector of the type.

Description
This fish reaches  in length. It has a yellow head, yellow ventral fins, and a large black spot at the back of its dorsal fin.

In aquarium
It having enough living rocks in aquarium, it settles peacefully but seldom threats incoming small fishes. It appears cowardly during facing the more aggressive damsel fishes.

References

External links
WoRMS - World Register of Marine Species - Chrysiptera talboti (Allen, 1975)
 

talboti
Taxa named by Gerald R. Allen
Fish described in 1975